Noah Benjamin Lennox (born July 17, 1978), also known by his moniker Panda Bear, is an American musician, singer-songwriter, multi-instrumentalist, and co-founding member of the band Animal Collective. In addition to his work with that group, Lennox has released six solo LPs since 1999, with his influential 2007 album Person Pitch inspiring numerous subsequent acts. His subsequent albums Tomboy (2011) and Panda Bear Meets the Grim Reaper (2015) both reached the Billboard 200.

Lennox was primarily raised in Baltimore, Maryland, where he sang tenor in his high school chamber choir, and studied piano and cello. The name "Panda Bear" derived from his habit of drawing pandas on his early mixtapes as a teenager. He and the other members of Animal Collective began collaborating in the late 1990s. He has also collaborated with other artists, including Daft Punk on their 2013 single "Doin' It Right" and Sonic Boom on the 2022 album Reset. Since 2004, he has lived in Lisbon, Portugal.

Early life
Lennox grew up in the Roland Park section of Baltimore, Maryland, and attended Waldorf School of Baltimore through 8th grade, and Kimberton Waldorf School in Chester County, Pennsylvania, for high school. His family moved frequently during his early years, owing to his father's studies to be an orthopedic surgeon. As a youth, he played sports, mainly soccer and basketball. His brother, Matt Lennox (whom the Animal Collective song "Brother Sport" is directed at), was a leading player on the high school basketball team and Noah was also a team member, playing as point guard.

Lennox has also stated in interviews that he enjoyed drawing a lot as a teenager, especially pandas, and later started drawing pandas on his early mixtapes. He also studied piano until he was eight, then cello, and later on he sang tenor in his high school chamber choir.

Though he and his family have never been very religious, Lennox briefly attended Boston University, where he majored in religion because of his interest in "the concept of God".

Career

Animal Collective

As a teen, Lennox began listening to electronic music styles such as house and techno, and artists such as Aphex Twin, all of which became a major influence on his later work. He recorded and performed music solo and with friends. Lennox started using the name "Panda Bear" because he drew pictures of pandas for the artwork of his recordings.

Lennox had been friends with Deakin (Josh Dibb) since the second grade. Deakin introduced Lennox to his high school friends Avey Tare (Dave Portner) and Geologist (Brian Weitz). For years, the four of them swapped homemade recordings, shared musical ideas and performed in different group configurations. Lennox, along with Deakin moved to New York in 2000. The band then became more collaborative in nature and they finally settled on the name "Animal Collective". 

Since the 2007 releases of Panda Bear's Person Pitch and Animal Collective's Strawberry Jam, he has focused more on using samplers and other electronics in their shows. He has named Black Dice as a major influence stating "Black Dice took us on our first tour and I feel like the wisest things I've learned about being in a band I learned by watching them." He said he looks to Black Dice "as a model for a band... I feel like as a band, I can't speak for the other guys [of Animal Collective], but certainly for myself, like I modelled the way I approach to everything with the band watching the way Black Dice did it." In addition to singing, Lennox played drums and occasionally guitar in Animal Collective's live performances. He cites Stewart Copeland as the biggest influence on his drumming style; for his drumming work on Animal Collective's 2022 album Time Skiffs, Lennox cited James Brown's drummers, especially Clyde Stubblefield, as influences.

Solo work
Lennox's early musical influences included electronic styles, and his solo work has been variously characterized as experimental pop, electronic, bedroom pop, neo-psychedelic pop, and indie music. The Line of Best Fit called him a "psychedelic pop trailblazer." Lennox's debut album Panda Bear was released in 1999 on Soccer Star Records. After focusing more on touring and recording with Animal Collective, he released the follow-up Young Prayer in 2004 and the highly acclaimed third solo album Person Pitch in 2007.  Of his songwriting style, Lennox says "I get impatient writing songs, I can't spend more than a couple of hours before I get frustrated. So I got to kind of spit it out real fast. My favorite songs are the ones where I worked really really fast on, when it comes all out in like two hours or something."

Panda Bear's fourth album, Tomboy, was released April 12, 2011, on his own label, Paw Tracks. He started performing material from Tomboy on December 5, 2008, at a show with No Age in Miami, Florida. During a brief European tour in January 2010, he played three shows consisting almost entirely of new material. On March 7, 2010, a tour setlist with titles for ten of the new songs was posted on Panda Bear's MySpace blog. He also played Primavera Sound Festival in 2010. The single "Tomboy" and the b-side "Slow Motion" were released in July 2010. It was announced in August that singles "You Can Count on Me" and "Alsatian Darn" would be released via Domino on September 28. The limited 500 copies of "You Can Count On Me" sold out in less than a day. The single "Last Night at the Jetty" was released December 2010. The single "Surfer's Hymn" was released March 28, 2011.

His song "Comfy In Nautica" appears in ABC's 2010 global warming movie Earth 2100.

Lennox was chosen by Jeff Mangum of Neutral Milk Hotel to perform at the All Tomorrow's Parties festival he planned to curate in December 2011 in Minehead, England. However, Lennox was unable to play when the event was rescheduled to March 2012.

In June 2013, Panda Bear performed a set of all new material at ATP. In October 2014, the Mr Noah EP was released, featuring four new songs. The full album, Panda Bear Meets the Grim Reaper, was released in January 2015.

In 2018, Lennox released the vinyl-only A Day With the Homies EP, a collection of five songs heavily influenced by house + bass music. Included on the packaging of the release were hidden URLs that pointed to samples used on the EP. In February 2019, he released the LP Buoys, featuring production work by longtime collaborator Rusty Santos. It was preceded by the single "Dolphin".

Outside musical collaborations
Lennox plays in the band Jane and Together with DJ Scott Mou. He has also performed on tracks with Atlas Sound (Bradford Cox of Deerhunter), Ducktails (Matt Mondanile, best known as the former lead guitarist of the American indie rock band Real Estate) and electronic musicians Zomby and Pantha du Prince.

Panda Bear appeared on the track "Doin' It Right" on the 2013 Daft Punk album Random Access Memories. The album won Daft Punk the Grammy Award for Album of the Year in 2014, making Panda Bear a co-winner. Almost a decade later, Lennox worked with previous Daft Punk collaborators Alan Braxe and DJ Falcon on their new duo's debut single, "Step By Step", in 2022.

Personal life
In 2004, Lennox moved from New York City to Lisbon, Portugal. He first visited the city for a vacation following a long Animal Collective tour in 2003. Lennox says about Lisbon: "Since I got off the airplane here [for the first time] I had a good feeling about this place." He met his wife, the fashion designer Fernanda Pereira, there; after visiting each other in Lisbon and New York, Lennox decided to move to Europe because he also felt "connected to the European way of life", considering himself as a "slow moving kind of person" and Lisbon as a "slow moving kind of place". Lennox and Pereira have a daughter, Nadja, born in 2005 and a son, born in June 2010. In 2007, he and Pereira collaborated on a line of sweatshirts called 2nd Things.

Musical equipment
Synthesizers
 Minimoog Voyager
 Korg M3

Digital samplers
 Elektron Octatrack
 Roland SP-555 
 Boss SP-303 "Dr. Sample"
 Teenage Engineering OP-1

Drum machine/synthesizer
 JoMoX Xbase 999

Discography

Studio albums

Extended plays

Singles
"I'm Not/Comfy in Nautica" (September 22, 2005, UUAR)
"Bros" (December 4, 2006, Fat Cat Records)
"Carrots" (January 23, 2007, Paw Tracks)
"Take Pills" (June 19, 2007, Paw Tracks)
"Tomboy" (July 13, 2010, Paw Tracks)
"You Can Count on Me" (October 19, 2010, Domino)
"Last Night at the Jetty" (December 13, 2010, FatCat Records)
"Surfer's Hymn" (March 28, 2011, Kompakt)
"Mr Noah" (October 23, 2014, Domino)
"Boys Latin" (December 15, 2014, Domino)
"Crosswords" (August 20, 2015, Domino)
"Dolphin" (November 8, 2018, Domino)
"Token" (January 14, 2019, Domino)
"Playing the Long Game" (October 9, 2019, Domino)

Remixes
"Boneless" (remix of Notwist song "Boneless") on "Boneless" 7"
"As Young As Yesterday" (remix of Korallreven song "As Young As Yesterday") on "As Young As Yesterday" 12" (2011)
"Cheap Treat (Panda Bear Version)" (remix of Eric Copeland song "Cheap Treat") on "Remixes" EP.
"Melody Unfair (Panda Bear Remix)" on Essence of Eucalyptus by Avey Tare
"Never Ending Game (Panda Bear Remix)" on Bigger House by Angel Du$t

Appearances
One untitled track on Visionaire 53 – Sound (December 1, 2007, Visionaire Publishing, LLC)
"Anna" on the album East of Eden by Taken by Trees (September 7, 2009)
"Walkabout" on the album Logos by Atlas Sound (October 20, 2009)
"Stick to My Side" on the album Black Noise by Pantha du Prince (February 9, 2010)
"Killin the Vibe" (bonus track) on the album Ducktails III: Arcade Dynamics by Ducktails (January 18, 2011)
"Atiba Song" composed music for a skateboarding montage directed by Atiba Jefferson and Ty Evans. The track was initially created by Atiba, then finished by Panda Bear.
"The Preakness" on the cassette tape Keep + Animal Collective (March 2011, Keep)
"Things Fall Apart" on the album Dedication by Zomby (July 11, 2011)
"Pyjama" on the album Tracer by Teengirl Fantasy (August 21, 2012)
"Doin' It Right" on the album Random Access Memories by Daft Punk (May 17, 2013)
"Time (Is)", "Binz", "Beltway" and "I'm a Witness" on the album When I Get Home by Solange (March 1, 2019)
"I Don't Need a Crowd" on the I Don't Need a Crowd/The One That Got Away 7" by Paul Maroon (March 15, 2019)
 "Studie" on the album Anicca by Teebs (September 18, 2019)
 "Gameday Continues" on the album HBCU Gameday by Sporting Life. (January 27, 2020)
 "Just a Little Piece of Me" on the album All Things Being Equal  by Sonic Boom. (June 5, 2020)
 "Step By Step" by Braxe + Falcon (March 29, 2022)

References

External links
Interview from 2008 on Onhiat.us
Ola's Kool Kitchen on Radio 23 – Panda Bear Live, Primavera 2010

American male singers
1978 births
21st-century American musicians
Living people
Ableton Live users
American expatriates in Portugal
Animal Collective members
Grammy Award winners
Experimental pop musicians
Domino Recording Company artists
21st-century American singers
FatCat Records artists